The Rally for Labour Democracy (Rassemblement pour la Démocratie du Travail) is a political party in Mali. 
At the last legislative elections, 14 July 2002, the party won 1 out of 160 seats as a part of the Hope 2002 coalition.

Labour parties
Political parties in Mali